Katemak is an Indonesian traditional dish from the East Nusa Tenggara Province. To prepare this dish, beef is boiled with sweet potatoes, sweet corn and some green vegetables such as cassava leaves and papaya leaves to make a soup. Some spices such as the small red onions, garlic and red chillies are added during cooking.

See also

 List of Indonesian dishes

References

External links 

  Katemak – Nusa Tenggara Timur

Indonesian cuisine